Anders Gidlund (born 29 April  1969) is a Swedish curler.

Teams

References

External links
 

1969 births
Swedish male curlers
Living people